Chenab College Chiniot is a college campus located on the highway bypass of Chiniot, in Chiniot District, Pakistan.  It operates under the Chenab College, located on Chiniot road  from Jhang.

Its facilities include a library, a physics lab, chemistry lab, and a computer lab.

The college transports students to and from their residences.

References

External links 
 Official Website of College

Universities and colleges in Chiniot District
Chiniot District
1993 establishments in Pakistan